The Monster Study was a stuttering experiment performed on 22 orphan children in Davenport, Iowa in 1939. It was conducted by Wendell Johnson at the University of Iowa. Graduate student  Mary Tudor conducted the experiment under Johnson's supervision. Half of the children received positive speech therapy, praising the fluency of their speech, and the other half, negative speech therapy, belittling the children for speech imperfections. Many of the normal speaking orphan children who received  negative therapy in the experiment suffered negative psychological effects, and some retained speech problems for the rest of their lives.

It was dubbed the "Monster Study" as some of Johnson's peers were horrified that he would experiment on orphan children to confirm a hypothesis. The experiment was kept hidden for fear Johnson's reputation would be tarnished in the wake of human experiments conducted by the Nazis during World War II. Because the results of the study were never published in any peer-reviewed journal, Tudor's thesis is the only official record of the details of the experiment.

The University of Iowa publicly apologized for the Monster Study in 2001. However, Paticia Zebrowski, University of Iowa assistant professor of speech pathology and audiology notes that the data that resulted from the experiment is the "largest collection of scientific information" on the phenomenon of stuttering and that Johnson's work was the first to discuss the importance of the stutterer's thoughts, attitudes, beliefs, and feelings and continues to influence views on stuttering greatly.

Study
The researchers had four questions in mind when carrying out the study:
 will 'removing' the label 'stutterer' from those who have been so labelled have any effect on their speech fluency?;
 will endorsement of the label 'stutterer' previously applied to an individual have any effect on their speech fluency?;
 will endorsement of the label 'normal speaker' previously applied to an individual have any effect on his speech fluency?; and
 will labelling a person previously regarded as a normal speaker, a 'stutterer' have any effect on their speech fluency?

The research began with a selection of twenty-two subjects from a veterans' orphanage in Iowa. None were told the intent of her research, and they believed that they were there to receive speech therapy. Tudor was trying to induce stuttering in healthy children and to see whether telling stutterers that their speech was fine would produce a change. Included among the twenty-two subjects were ten orphans whom teachers and matrons had marked as stutterers before the study began. Tudor and five other graduate students who agreed to serve as judges listened to each of the children speak, graded them on a scale from 1 (poor) to 5 (fluent) and concurred with the school's assessment. Five were assigned to Group IA, the experimental set, and would be told that their speech was fine. The five in Group IB, the control group, would be told that their speech is "as bad as people say".

The remaining 12 children were chosen at random from the population of normally fluent orphans. Six of these were assigned to IIA. These children, ranging in age from 5 to 15, were to be told that their speech was horrible, that they were beginning to stutter, and that they must correct this immediately. The final six children in Group IIB, similar in age to those in IIA, were normal speakers who were to be treated as such and given compliments on their nice enunciation.

On the first visit, Tudor tested each child's I.Q. and identified whether they were left-handed or right-handed. A popular theory at the time held that stuttering was caused by a cerebral imbalance. If, for example, a person was born left-handed but was using their right hand, their nerve impulses would misfire, affecting their speech. Johnson did not believe the theory, but still suggested Tudor test each child's handedness. She had them draw on chalkboards and squeeze the bulb of a dynamometer. Most were right-handed, but left-handed children were present in all the groups. There was no correlation between handedness and speech in the subjects.  During this period, they assigned numbers to the children, such as "Case No 15 Experimental Group IIA..."

The experimental period lasted from January until late May 1939, and the actual intervention consisted of Tudor driving to Davenport from Iowa City every few weeks and talking with each child for about 45 minutes. She followed an agreed-upon script. In her dissertation, she reported that she talked to the stuttering youngsters who were going to be told that they did not stutter. She said to them, in part, "You'll outgrow [the stuttering], and you will be able to speak even much better than you are speaking now... Pay no attention to what others say about your speaking ability for undoubtedly they do not realize that this is only a phase."

To the non-stuttering youngsters in IIA, who were to be branded stutterers, she said: "The staff has come to the conclusion that you have a great deal of trouble with your speech… You have many of the symptoms of a child who is beginning to stutter. You must try to stop yourself immediately. Use your will power… Do anything to keep from stuttering… Don't ever speak unless you can do it right. You see how [the name of a child in the institution who stuttered severely] stutters, don't you? Well, he undoubtedly started this very same way."

The children in IIA responded immediately. After her second session with 5-year-old Norma Jean Pugh, Tudor wrote, "It was very difficult to get her to speak, although she spoke very freely the month before." Another in the group, 9-year-old Betty Romp, "practically refuses to talk," a researcher wrote in his final evaluation. "Held hand or arm over eyes most of the time." Hazel Potter, 15, the oldest in her group, became "much more conscious of herself, and she talked less," Tudor noted. Potter also began to interject and to snap her fingers in frustration. She was asked why she said 'a' so much. "Because I'm afraid I can't say the next word." "Why did you snap your fingers?" "Because I was afraid I was going to say 'a.'"

All the children's schoolwork fell off. One of the boys began refusing to recite in class. The other, eleven-year-old Clarence Fifer, started anxiously correcting himself. "He stopped and told me he was going to have trouble on words before he said them," Tudor reported. She asked him how he knew. He said that the sound "wouldn't come out. Feels like it's stuck in there."

The sixth orphan, Mary Korlaske, a 12-year-old, grew withdrawn and fractious. During their sessions, Tudor asked whether her best friend knew about her 'stuttering,' Korlaske muttered, "No." "Why not?" Korlaske shuffled her feet. "I hardly ever talk to her." Two years later, she ran away from the orphanage and eventually ended up at the rougher Industrial School for Girls — simultaneously escaping her human experimentation.

Mary Tudor herself wasn't untouched. Three times after her experiment had officially ended, she returned to the orphanage to voluntarily provide follow-up care. She told the IIA children that they didn't stutter after all. The impact, however well-meaning, was questionable. She wrote to Johnson about the orphans in a slightly defensive letter dated April 22, 1940, "I believe that in time they … will recover, but we certainly made a definite impression on them."

Criticism
The results of the study were freely available in the library of the University of Iowa, but Johnson did not seek publication of the results. The experiment became national news in the wake of a series of articles conducted by an investigative reporter at the San Jose Mercury News in 2001, and a book titled Ethics: A Case Study from Fluency was written to provide an impartial scientific evaluation. The panel of authors in the book consists mostly of speech pathologists who fail to reach any consensus on either the ethical ramifications or scientific consequences of the Monster Study. Richard Schwartz concludes in Chapter 6 of the book that the Monster Study "was unfortunate in Tudor and Johnson's lack of regard for the potential harm to the children who participated and in their selection of institutionalized children simply because they were easily available. The deception and the apparent lack of debriefing were also not justifiable." Other authors concur claiming the orphan experiment was not within the ethical boundaries of acceptable research. Others, however, felt that the ethical standards in 1939 were different from those used today. Some felt the study was poorly designed and executed by Tudor, and as a result the data offered no proof of Johnson's subsequent hypothesis that "stuttering begins, not in the child's mouth but in the parent's ear"—i.e., that it is the well-meaning parent's effort to help the child avoid what the parent has labeled "stuttering" (but is in fact within the range of normal speech) that contributes to what ultimately becomes the problem diagnosed as stuttering.

Compensation
On 17 August 2007, seven of the orphan children were awarded a total of $1.2M by the State of Iowa for lifelong psychological and emotional scars caused by six months of torment during the University of Iowa experiment. The study learned that although none of the children became stutterers, some became self-conscious and reluctant to speak. A spokesman for the University of Iowa called the experiment "regrettable" and added: "This is a study that should never be considered defensible in any era. In no way would I ever think of defending this study. In no way. It’s more than unfortunate." Before her death, Mary Tudor expressed deep regret about her role in the Monster Study and maintained that Wendell Johnson should have done more to reverse the negative effects on the orphan children's speech.

Story origins

The lawsuit was an outgrowth of a San Jose Mercury News article in 2001 conducted by an investigative reporter.

The article revealed that several of the orphans had long-lasting psychological effects stemming from the experiment. The state tried unsuccessfully to have the lawsuit dismissed but in September 2005,  Iowa's Supreme Court justices agreed with a lower court in rejecting the state's claim of immunity and petition for dismissal.

Many of the orphans testified that they were harmed by the "Monster Study" but outside of Mary Tudor, who testified in a deposition on November 19, 2002, there were no eyewitnesses. The advanced age of the three surviving former orphans on the plaintiff's side helped expedite a settlement with the state.

"For the plaintiffs, we hope and believe it will help provide closure relating to experiences from long ago and to memories going back almost 70 years. For all parties, it ends long-running, difficult and costly litigation that only would have run up more expenses and delayed resolution to plaintiffs who are in their seventies and eighties." (DM Register)

Despite the settlement, the debate remains contentious over what harm, if any, the Monster Study caused the orphan children. Nicholas Johnson, the son of the late Wendell Johnson, has vehemently defended his father. He and some speech pathologists have argued that Wendell Johnson did not intend to harm the orphan children and that none of the orphans were diagnosed as "stutterers" at the end of the experiment. Other speech pathologists have condemned the experiment and said that the orphans' speech and behavior was adversely affected by the negative conditioning they received. Letters between Mary Tudor and Wendell Johnson that were written shortly after the experiment ended showed that the children's speech had deteriorated significantly. Mary Tudor returned to the orphanage three times to try to reverse the negative effects caused by the experiment but lamented the fact that she was unable to provide enough positive therapy to reverse the deleterious effects. 

Today, the American Speech-Language-Hearing Association prohibits experimentation on children when there exists a significant chance of causing lasting harmful consequences.

References

External links
'Monster Study' Still Stings. Orphans Subjected To Intense Ridicule In Bid To Make Them Stutter
Ethics and Orphans: The `Monster Study'

Psychology experiments
University of Iowa
Research ethics
Human subject research in the United States
Stuttering
1939 in Iowa
Human subject research in psychiatry
Adoption, fostering, orphan care and displacement
Medical scandals in the United States
Child welfare in the United States